The 1967 Sun Bowl featured the UTEP Miners and the Ole Miss Rebels.

Background
Ole Miss had qualified for a bowl game every season since the 1957 season, and this was their 11th consecutive bowl season. They tied for 6th in the Southeastern Conference. The Miners were playing their first season after being renamed from Texas Western College to UTEP. This was their eighth bowl game, the previous seven also being in the Sun Bowl.

Game summary
UTEP's Billy Stevens was named MVP for the second time, having been named MVP in 1965. Bruce Newell gave the Rebels their only score of the day on a touchdown run set up by Mac McClure's interception return. Trailing 7–0 in the fourth, Stevens went to work, leading the Miners on a 76-yard drive culminating with a touchdown pass to David Kerns to tie the game. A forced fumble by Fred Carr recovered by Dennis Bishop set up the Miners in the position to win the game, and Larry McHenry scored four plays later with 7:52 left. But Ole Miss could not make a successful drive as UTEP held on to win their second Sun Bowl in three years. Stevens went 13 of 26 for 155 yards, outyarding the entire Ole Miss team, who only had 109 yards of offense.

Aftermath
This is to date the last bowl game the Miners have won, and they have lost their past six bowl games. They would join the Western Athletic Conference the year after this game. They have not reached the Sun Bowl since this game as well. Ole Miss would continue their bowl streak until 1971. Coincidentally, they also have not reached the Sun Bowl since this game.

Statistics

References

Sun Bowl
Sun Bowl
Ole Miss Rebels football bowl games
UTEP Miners football bowl games
1967 in sports in Texas
December 1967 sports events in the United States